The 2006 Oregon gubernatorial election took place on November 7, 2006. Incumbent Democratic Governor of Oregon Ted Kulongoski ran for a second and final term as governor. Kulongoski faced several challengers in his primary, whom he dispatched to win his party's nomination a second time, while Republican nominee Ron Saxton, the former Chair of the Portland Public Schools Board and a candidate for governor in 2002 emerged from a crowded primary. Kulongoski and Saxton were initially going to be challenged in the general election by State Senator Ben Westlund, but Westlund withdrew his candidacy before the general election. There were multiple independent and third party challengers on the ballot as well. In a hard-fought campaign, Kulongoski won re-election by a surprisingly wide margin, winning his second term as governor.

As of 2022, this marks the last occasion in which the following counties have voted Democratic in a gubernatorial election: Clackamas, Columbia, Marion, and Wasco.

Democratic primary

Candidates
Ted Kulongoski, incumbent Governor of Oregon
Jim Hill, former Oregon State Treasurer, 2002 Democratic candidate for Governor of Oregon
Peter Sorenson, Lane County Commissioner

Results

Republican primary

Candidates
Ron Saxton, former Chair of the Portland Public Schools Board
Kevin Mannix, former Oregon State Representative, 2002 Republican nominee for Governor of Oregon
Jason Atkinson, Oregon State Senator
W. Ames Curtright
Gordon Leitch
William E. Spidal
David W. Beem
Bob Leonard Forthan, perennial candidate

Results

General election

Campaign
As the Democratic and Republican primaries intensified, State Senator Ben Westlund, a registered Republican, announced that he would run for governor as an independent. Though Westlund gathered the requisite signatures to be able to run, he eventually dropped out of the race in August, noting, "At the beginning of this campaign, I made a commitment to the people of Oregon, that I was in it to win it, and that I absolutely would not play a spoiler role." Constitution Party nominee Mary Starrett was widely perceived to win votes largely at the expense of Saxton's campaign.

Predictions

Polling

Results

See also
Oregon statewide elections, 2006
2006 United States gubernatorial elections
List of Oregon Governors

References

Official campaigns websites
 Ted Kulongoski (D) for Governor
 Ron Saxton (R) for Governor

2006
Gubernatorial
Oregon